Greek Argentines are Argentine citizens of Greek descent or Greek-born people who reside in Argentina. Despite not being as large as other Europe communities, the Greeks have contributed a lot to their new country. The first immigrants arrived at the end of the 18th century, while the bulk of immigration occurred during the first half of the 20th century. Included are Aromanians and Megleno-Romanians, who became adjusted to Argentine society because of the linguistic similarities between Eastern Romance and Spanish, as well as Latin identity of Aromanians and Megleno-Romanians.

History
Rear Admiral Giorgos "Jorge" Kolmaniatis, a native from Hydra who arrived in the United Provinces of the Río de la Plata in 1811, strongly contributed to the Argentine War of Independence by leading and training the newly formed fleet. Samuel Spiro, a fellow naval officer, either from Spetses or Mytilene, scuttled his ship in the Uruguay River rather than surrender it to the Spanish Armada. Both men's names were honored with Argentine Navy ships christened after them in 1937.

The second wave of Greeks arriving in Argentina came in the 20th century,  mainly after the Asia Minor Campaign and the disaster in 1922, with the end of the Megali Idea.  Again huge masses of refugees who were sent to Greece by the population exchange agreement between Kemal Atatürk and Eleftherios Venizelos, came towards these latitudes seeking a chance to restart their lives from zero. Most of them were from Smyrna, Ayvalık and other Ionian cities. They settled in what is today known as the capital of foreign immigration in Argentina, the city of Berisso, near La Plata.

The third wave, taking place in the early 1930s,  was the first one with a strong concentration of immigrants coming from the mainland, mostly villagers and peasants from Arcadia, Laconia and Messenia in the Peloponnese.  The choice of Argentina as a destination was due to the temporary denial of immigration to the United States, making Argentina in particular the new Eldorado.

The majority chose Buenos Aires as their place to stay, but others made their way far in the interior such as Córdoba, Mendoza and even Tartagal.  Port cities like Rosario, Zárate, Campana, Berisso and Necochea are also places where Hellenic immigrants established.

Notable Greek Argentines

 Anacarsis Lanús - businessman
 Bartolomé Mitre - President of Argentina from 1862 to 1868. The original family name was Mitropoulos and later changed to Mitre
 Emanuel Moriatis - race car driver
 Aristotle Onassis - lived in Argentina during the 1920s and 1930s, becoming the leading local cigarette importer
 Christina Onassis - Aristotle's daughter
 Oscar Panno - chess grandmaster
 Graciela Paraskevaidis - writer and composer
 Samuel Spiro - naval officer and patriot
 Constantino Tsallis - physics researcher
 Adriana Xenides - actress
 Emiliano Ellacopulos - football player
 Mónica Antonópulos - actress
 Eduardos Kontogeorgakis - professional footballer
 Gabriel Katopodis - politician
 Alexandra Kehayoglou - artist

See also

 Argentina–Greece relations
 Embassy of Argentina, Athens
 Greek diaspora
 Ashes of Paradise, a 1997 Argentine film

References

External links
 "Asociación Cultural Helénica Nostos"
 Bilateral relations between Greece and Argentina
  Greek association
 List of Greek associations in Argentina
 Another Greek association
 Voice of Greece: the Balkans in Argentina

 
European Argentine
Argentina